Brian Tyson (birth registered first ¼ 1930) is an English former professional rugby league footballer who played in the 1950s and 1960s.

Background
Brian Tyson's birth was registered in Sculcoates district, East Riding of Yorkshire, England.

Playing career

International honours
Brian Tyson won caps for Great Britain while at Hull Kingston Rovers in 1963 against Australia, in 1965 against France, and in 1967 against France.

County honours
Brian Tyson won caps for Yorkshire while at Hull Kingston Rovers.

Eastern Division Championship Final appearances
Brian Tyson played left-, i.e. number 11, in Hull Kingston Rovers' 13–10 victory over Huddersfield in the Eastern Division Championship Final during the 1962–63 season at Headingley Rugby Stadium, Leeds on Saturday 10 November 1962.

Challenge Cup Final appearances
Brian Tyson played  in Hull Kingston Rovers' 5-13 defeat by Widnes in the 1963–64 Challenge Cup Final during the 1963–64 season at Wembley Stadium, London on Saturday 9 May 1964, in front of a crowd of 84,488.

County Cup Final appearances
Brian Tyson played left-, i.e. number 11, in Hull Kingston Rovers' 2-12 defeat by Hunslet in the 1962 Yorkshire County Cup Final during the 1962–63 season at Headingley Rugby Stadium, Leeds on Saturday 27 October 1962, and played right-, i.e. number 10, in Hull Kingston Rovers' 25-12 victory over Featherstone Rovers in the 1966 Yorkshire County Cup Final during the 1966–67 season at Headingley Rugby Stadium, Leeds on Saturday 15 October 1966.

References

External links
!Great Britain Statistics at englandrl.co.uk (statistics currently missing due to not having appeared for both Great Britain, and England)
(archived by web.archive.org) Workington and Hull KR triumph in the regions

1930 births
Living people
English rugby league players
Great Britain national rugby league team players
Hull Kingston Rovers players
People from Sculcoates
Rugby league players from Kingston upon Hull
Rugby league props
Yorkshire rugby league team players